Richard Cross Wynn (1892 – 9 August 1919) was an English professional footballer who appeared in the Football League for Middlesbrough as an outside left. He guested for Brentford during the First World War.

Personal life 
Wynn served as a sergeant in the Yorkshire Regiment during the First World War and together with his brother Robert, he arrived on the Western Front in June 1916. In February 1919, three months after the armistice, he was transferred to the Labour Corps. Wynn died in August 1919, following an operation on injuries received in an accident. He was buried in Étaples Military Cemetery.

Career statistics

References

1892 births
1919 deaths
Military personnel from Liverpool
Footballers from Liverpool
English footballers
Association football outside forwards
Chester City F.C. players
Middlesbrough F.C. players
English Football League players
Brentford F.C. wartime guest players
British Army personnel of World War I
Green Howards soldiers
Royal Pioneer Corps soldiers
Burials at Étaples Military Cemetery